Dangerous Money, also known as Hot Money, is a 1946 American film directed by Terry O. Morse, featuring Sidney Toler as Charlie Chan. This is the second and last appearance of Willie Best as Chattanooga Brown, the cousin of Charlie Chan's usual chauffeur, Birmingham Brown (Mantan Moreland).

Plot 
Aboard an ocean liner in the South Pacific, US Treasury agent Scott Pearson confidentially asks Charlie Chan for help; two attempts have been made on his life. Chan rescues him from a third, but not the fourth (a knife in the back). The captain asks Chan to complete the dead man's mission and find out who is responsible for the recent surfacing of counterfeit dollars and stolen art. Chan declines, citing urgent business in Australia, but sets out to find the murderer.

Cast 
 Sidney Toler as Charlie Chan
 Victor Sen Yung as Jimmy Chan (Number 2 son)
 Joseph Crehan as Captain Black
 Willie Best as Chattanooga Brown
 John Harmon as Freddie Kirk
 Bruce Edwards as Harold Mayfair
 Dick Elliott as P.T. Burke
 Joseph Allen as George Brace, the Purser
 Gloria Warren as Rona Simmonds, an English tourist with a crush on the purser George Brace
 Rick Vallin as Tao Erickson
 Amira Moustafa as Laura Erickson, Tao's wife
 Tristram Coffin as Scott Pearson
 Selmer Jackson as Ship's Doctor
 Dudley Dickerson as Big Ben
 Rito Punay as Pete the Steward
 Emmett Vogan as Professor Martin
 Elaine Lange as Cynthia Martin, the professor's wife
 Leslie Denison as missionary, Reverend Whipple (alias for Theodore M. Lane)
 Alan Douglas as Joe Murdock, man posing as Mrs. Whipple

Production
The film entered the public domain due to the omission of a valid copyright notice on its original prints.

Notes

External links 

Download from Odysee

1946 films
American black-and-white films
Charlie Chan films
Films directed by Terry O. Morse
Films set in Samoa
Articles containing video clips
American comedy mystery films
1940s comedy mystery films
1940s English-language films
1940s American films